The 23rd Toronto Film Critics Association Awards, honoring the best in film for 2019, were awarded on December 8, 2019.

Winners

References

2019
2019 film awards
2019 in Toronto
2019 in Canadian cinema